Golondrinas or Golondrina, Spanish for swallows, may refer to:

Places

Argentina 
Las Golondrinas, Argentina, a settlement in Cushamen Department, Chubut Province
Puerto Golondrina, a suburb of the city of Ushuaia
Golondrina (yacht), the yacht of President of the Republica Argentina (ARA Golondrina (A-10)).

Mexico 
Cave of Swallows, Sótano de las Golondrinas, a cave in San Luis Potosí

Puerto Rico 
San Germán, Puerto Rico, "Ciudad de las Golondrinas", the second oldest city of Puerto Rico 
Las Golondrinas Cavern, a cave and place of interest in Ciales municipality

Spain 
Golondrinas, a neighborhood in the Macarena District of Seville

United States 
Golondrinas, New Mexico, a village in Mora County, New Mexico
El Rancho de las Golondrinas, an historic ranch in Santa Fe County, New Mexico

Music
Dos Golondrinas, an orchestral piece by Venezuelan composer Aldemaro Romero, see El Garrasí
"Las Golondrinas", a traditional Mexican song by Mexican composer Narciso Serradell, written in 1862, and that has become an anthem for Mexican expats.
"Las Golondrinas", a song by Argentine singer Jorge Cafrune on the Uruguayan version of his fourth album Cafrune (album) and on his fifth, Jorge Cafrune (album)
Las golondrinas (zarzuela), a zarzuela by Basque composer José María Usandizaga

 “ Ojitos De Golondrina” , a song by Mexican singer and composer Joan Sebastian, released in 1991. In this song he compares his lovers eyes with that of a Golondrina(swallow).

Other
Golondrina point, a Paleo-Indian projectile point 
Golondrina, Brownies section in the Association of Guides and Scouts of Chile